Ron Fanuatanu (born 7 July 1982, Apia, Samoa) is a Samoan former rugby union player. He played as a wing.

Career
His first international cap was against Ireland, at Apia, on June 20, 2003. He was also part of the 2003 Rugby World Cup roster, where he only played the match against Georgia at Perth.

Notes

External links

1982 births
Living people
Samoan rugby union players
Rugby union wings
Samoa international rugby union players